Love it or leave it may refer to:

Politics
 "Brazil, love it or leave it", nationalist slogan of the Brazilian military dictatorship
 "America, love it or leave it", a slogan that became common during Vietnam War protests

Film and television
 "Love it or Leave it, Change it or Lose it", an episode of the American drama series Bracken's World 
 Kochaj albo rzuć (Love It or Leave It), a Polish 1977 movie by Sylwester Chęciński
 Italy: Love it, or Leave it, an Italian 2011 documentary and docudrama by Gustav Hofer and Luca Ragazzi

Music

Songs
 "Love It or Leave It Alone", a song by Etta James on the album Love's Been Rough on Me
 "Love It Or Leave It", a song by K.Maro on the album Perfect Stranger
 "Love It or Leave It Alone/Welcome to Jamrock", a song by Alicia Keys on the album Unplugged
 "Love It or Leave It", a song by Robby Krieger on the album No Habla
 "Love It or Leave It Alone", a song  by Michie Mee on the album The First Cut Is the Deepest
 "Love It or Leave It", a song by Misery Index on the album Hang Em High
 "Love It Or Leave It", a song by Heidi Montag on the album Superficial
 "Love it or leave it", a song Asaf Avidan on the album Different Pulses

Other uses
 Love It Or Leave It, short story by Charles Bukowski on the book Tales of Ordinary Madness
 "Love it or leave it", an irreversible binomial idiomatic expression

See also
 "Bicentennial Blues (Love It or Leave It)", a song by Ray Manzarek on the album The Whole Thing Started with Rock & Roll Now It's Out of Control
 "It's America (Love It or Leave It)", a song by Ernest Tubb on the album Good Year for the Wine
 Lovett or Leave It, political podcast hosted by Jon Lovett